Eresia may refer to:

Eresia, a journal edited by Enrico Arrigoni
Eresia (butterfly), a genus of butterflies